Singair Government College is a college in Singair, Manikganj. From the beginning, the college had undergraduate (pass) and undergraduate (honors) with higher secondary.

History 
The college is established in 1st July in 1970. Starting with only HSC candidates, in 1975, it had been included in Dhaka University with undergraduate (pass) and undergraduate (honors). From 1975, undergraduate students from this college have been participating in various exams with credits. Since 1998, Business Management (BM) branch has been introduced under Bangladesh Technical Education Board. The college has started honors courses in social work and management from the 2011–12 academic year.

Present 
Right now, there are 33 teaching staffs in the college. Every day, classes are held from 9 a.m. to 2 p.m.  Degree (Pass) and Honors classes are held till 3 p.m. Currently, there are three thousand learners in the college of various course.

Future plans 
In near future, there are plans to introduce Honors and Masters courses in required subjects including accounting and political science in this college.

References 

Educational institutions established in 1970
Colleges in Manikganj District
Universities and colleges in Manikganj District
Colleges in Bangladesh